Nilgunak (also Romanized as Nīlgūnak and Nilgoonak) is a village in Kaftarak Rural District, in the Central District of Shiraz County, Fars Province, Iran. At the 2006 census, its population was 535, in 116 families.

References 

Populated places in Shiraz County